Franco Lalli (born March 11, 1985) is a Canadian former soccer player who most recently played for North York Astros in the Canadian Soccer League.

Club career
Lalli began playing soccer at the youth level with the Woodbridge Strikers, Woodbridge Town Football Club, Brampton Lions, Ontario Provincial team and the University of Notre Dame before playing abroad in Italy, where he had stints with U.S.D. Lucera Calcio, Foggia Calcio, S.S. Cavese 1919, US Avellino and Foggia Calcio. In 2005, he signed with Lombard-Pápa TFC in the Hungarian National Championship II, before being released in 2006. On April 17, 2008 the North York Astros announced the signing of Lalli for the 2008 season. He recorded his first Astros goal on August 9 against the Brampton Lions. Throughout the season Lalli helped the Astros set an all time record for most points and wins in a season, and helped the team qualify for the playoffs. In the quarterfinal match of the playoffs Lalli scored the Astros only goal to bring the match to extra time, but unfortunately the Serbian White Eagles would score the winning goal to advance to the semifinals.

International career
Lalli appeared for Canada in the 2005 FIFA World Youth Championship, although he did not play in the tournament. In total he recorded four appearances with the Canadian national U-20 team.

Style of play
A versatile player, Lalli is known for being an all-rounder, and can play as a forward or as an offensive midfielder on both the left or as right flanks.

Personal life 
Lalli lives in Toronto and is fan of Roberto Baggio.

References

External links

1985 births
Association football midfielders
Brampton United players
Canada men's youth international soccer players
Canadian Soccer League (1998–present) players
Canadian soccer players
Canadian expatriate soccer players
Living people
Lombard-Pápa TFC footballers
North York Astros players
Notre Dame Fighting Irish men's soccer players
Soccer players from Toronto